The thirteenth season of the American animated television series SpongeBob SquarePants, created by former marine biologist and animator Stephen Hillenburg, began airing on Nickelodeon in the United States on October 22, 2020. The series chronicles the exploits and adventures of the title character and his various friends in the fictional underwater city of Bikini Bottom. This is the first season without Hillenburg's involvement, following his death on November 26, 2018, though he is still credited as an executive producer. Marc Ceccarelli, Vincent Waller, and Jennie Monica took over the executive producer roles after his death.

Production
On July 17, 2019, it was announced that the series had been renewed for a thirteenth season consisting of 13 episodes. The season began airing on October 22, 2020. On August 11, 2021, it was announced that Nickelodeon had ordered 13 additional episodes for the thirteenth season.

Episodes

The episodes are ordered below according to Nickelodeon's packaging order, and not their original production or broadcast order.

Specials

Notes

References

SpongeBob SquarePants seasons
2020 American television seasons
2021 American television seasons
2022 American television seasons
2023 American television seasons